Rognan is a village and the administrative centre of the municipality of Saltdal in Nordland county, Norway. The village is located at the innermost part of Skjerstad Fjord, called Saltdal Fjord.

Local activity 

Local industry includes the optical cable factory of Nexans Norway and Hepro. The Nordland Line and the European route E6 both pass through the village. Rognan Station is the local railway station. Rognan Airport only serves general aviation. Saltdal Church is located in this village.

Rognan gained national attention through a reality documentary television series called "Alt For Rognan" in 2006.  The show aired on TV2, and followed a group of ten local men and their quest to create a live show on the cabaret and revue theatre Chat Noir.

Notable people

Sister cities
Rognan is twinned with the following cities:
  Fauske, Serbia

References

See also
Prison camps in North Norway during World War Two

Saltdal
Villages in Nordland
Populated places of Arctic Norway